Killyleagh Youth Football Club (also known as Killyleagh YC) is a Northern Irish, intermediate-level football club based in Killyleagh, near Downpatrick, playing in the Premier Division of the Northern Amateur Football League. The club was formed in 1960, playing in the South Belfast Youth League for one season before joining the Amateur League in 1961. Intermediate status was achieved in 1963. They play their home matches at the Showgrounds in Killyleagh. Perhaps their biggest achievement of recent times was when they reached the semi-final of the Irish Cup in 2002, losing 4–0 to Linfield. .
They became the first team in the modern era to win the Amateur League's Premier Section title for six seasons in a row between 1999 and 2005, under the managership of Dee Heron.

Honours

Intermediate honours 
Steel & Sons Cup: 1
2002–03
  Northern Amateur Football League: 8
 1984–85, 1992–93, 1999–00, 2000–01, 2001–02, 2002–03, 2003–04, 2004–05
Clarence Cup: 3
1997–98, 2000–01, 2001–02
Border Cup: 4
1984–85, 1996–97, 2002–03, 2003–04

External links
 Killyleagh Youth Football Club Official Website
 Welcome to Killyleagh - History of Killyleagh Youth Football Club
 nifootball.co.uk - (For fixtures, results and tables of all Northern Ireland amateur football leagues)

Notes

 

Association football clubs in Northern Ireland
Association football clubs established in 1960
Association football clubs in County Down
Northern Amateur Football League clubs
1960 establishments in Northern Ireland
Killyleagh